The Houston Rockets are an American professional basketball team based in Houston, Texas. The team plays in the Southwest Division of the Western Conference in National Basketball Association (NBA). The team was established in 1967, and played in San Diego, California for four years before being moved to Houston. In the Rockets debut season, they won only 15 games. However, after drafting Elvin Hayes first overall in the 1969 NBA Draft, they made their first appearance in the playoffs in 1969. After Hayes was traded, Moses Malone was acquired to replace him. Malone won two MVPs during his time in Houston, and he led the Rockets to the conference finals in his first year with the team. He also took the Rockets to the NBA Finals in 1981, but they were defeated in six games by the Boston Celtics. In 1984, the Rockets drafted Hakeem Olajuwon, who led them to the 1986 Finals in his second year, where they lost again to Boston. In the next seven seasons, they lost in the first round of the playoffs five times. They won their first NBA championship in 1994, led by Olajuwon, who won Finals MVP. They repeated as champions the next year, and Olajuwon won Finals MVP once again. To date, the Rockets have not advanced to the finals again. The Rockets missed the playoffs from 1999 to 2003, and did not make the playoffs again until after they drafted Yao Ming in 2002. Since then, the Rockets have had a winning season in all but two of the next 14 seasons and, led by James Harden, advanced to the conference finals in 2015.

The following is a list of all the players, both past and current, who have appeared in at least one game for the franchise.



Players
Note: Statistics are correct through the end of the  season.

A to B

|-
|align="left"| || align="center"|F/C || align="left"|Iowa State || align="center"|4 || align="center"|– || 206 || 4,943 || 1,750 || 310 || 1,966 || 24.0 || 8.5 || 1.5 || 9.5 || align=center|
|-
|align="left"| || align="center"|F/C || align="left"|Oral Roberts || align="center"|1 || align="center"| || 6 || 23 || 6 || 0 || 6 || 3.8 || 1.0 || 0.0 || 1.0 || align=center|
|-
|align="left"| || align="center"|F || align="left"|Hillsdale || align="center"|1 || align="center"| || 23 || 195 || 47 || 11 || 77 || 8.5 || 2.0 || 0.5 || 3.3 || align=center|
|-
|align="left"| || align="center"|F || align="left"|Northwestern || align="center"|2 || align="center"|– || 85 || 2,415 || 589 || 176 || 950 || 28.4 || 6.9 || 2.1 || 11.2 || align=center|
|-
|align="left"| || align="center"|G || align="left"|Loyola Marymount || align="center"|2 || align="center"|– || 112 || 2,165 || 297 || 351 || 745 || 19.3 || 2.7 || 3.1 || 6.7 || align=center|
|-
|align="left"| || align="center"|F || align="left"|UConn || align="center"|1 || align="center"| || 8 || 63 || 22 || 1 || 21 || 7.9 || 2.8 || 0.1 || 2.6 || align=center|
|-
|align="left"| || align="center"|C || align="left"|Kansas || align="center"|1 || align="center"| || 30 || 213 || 57 || 6 || 50 || 7.1 || 1.9 || 0.2 || 1.7 || align=center|
|-
|align="left"| || align="center"|G || align="left"|Fresno State || align="center"|4 || align="center"|– || 267 || 9,588 || 941 || 1,519 || 3,370 || 35.9 || 3.5 || 5.7 || 12.6 || align=center|
|-
|align="left"| || align="center"|C || align="left"| FC Barcelona || align="center"|1 || align="center"| || 63 || 891 || 208 || 44 || 367 || 14.1 || 3.3 || 0.7 || 5.8 || align=center|
|-
|align="left"| || align="center"|G || align="left"|Kentucky || align="center"|1 || align="center"| || 20 || 582 || 83 || 53 || 216 || 29.1 || 4.2 || 2.7 || 10.8 || align=center|
|-
|align="left"| || align="center"|G/F || align="left"|Oklahoma State || align="center"|1 || align="center"| || 29 || 307 || 58 || 33 || 115 || 10.6 || 2.0 || 1.1 || 4.0 || align=center|
|-
|align="left"| || align="center"|F/C || align="left"|UC Santa Barbara || align="center"|2 || align="center"|– || 63 || 365 || 96 || 37 || 176 || 5.8 || 1.5 || 0.6 || 2.8 || align=center|
|-
|align="left"| || align="center"|F || align="left"|California || align="center"|3 || align="center"|– || 140 || 3,855 || 668 || 130 || 1,601 || 27.5 || 4.8 || 0.9 || 11.4 || align=center|
|-
|align="left"| || align="center"|G/F || align="left"|Georgia || align="center"|2 || align="center"|– || 164 || 5,096 || 717 || 428 || 1,719 || 31.1 || 4.4 || 2.6 || 10.5 || align=center|
|-
|align="left"| || align="center"|F || align="left"|Syracuse || align="center"|1 || align="center"| || 10 || 294 || 54 || 5 || 134 || 29.4 || 5.4 || 0.5 || 13.4 || align=center|
|-
|align="left"| || align="center"|F || align="left"|UCLA || align="center"|5 || align="center"|– || 382 || 13,460 || 1,980 || 953 || 4,863 || 35.2 || 5.2 || 2.5 || 12.7 || align=center|
|-
|align="left"| || align="center"|F/C || align="left"|UConn || align="center"|1 || align="center"| || 9 || 40 || 6 || 3 || 10 || 4.4 || 0.7 || 0.3 || 1.1 || align=center|
|-
|align="left"| || align="center"|F || align="left"|St. John's || align="center"|1 || align="center"| || 69 || 2,452 || 359 || 229 || 1,181 || 35.5 || 5.2 || 3.3 || 17.1 || align=center|
|-
|align="left"| || align="center"|C || align="left"| Fenerbahçe || align="center"|2 || align="center"|– || 130 || 3,432 || 1,334 || 100 || 1,112 || 26.4 || 10.3 || 0.8 || 8.6 || align=center|
|-
|align="left"| || align="center"|G || align="left"|Texas || align="center"|2 || align="center"|– || 54 || 926 || 85 || 152 || 393 || 17.1 || 1.6 || 2.8 || 7.3 || align=center|
|-
|align="left"| || align="center"|G/F || align="left"|UTEP || align="center"|2 || align="center"|– || 77 || 708 || 132 || 100 || 192 || 9.2 || 1.7 || 1.3 || 2.5 || align=center|
|-
|align="left"| || align="center"|F/C || align="left"|Rutgers || align="center"|2 || align="center"|– || 142 || 2,889 || 762 || 144 || 1,622 || 20.3 || 5.4 || 1.0 || 11.4 || align=center|
|-
|align="left"| || align="center"|F || align="left"|Hartford || align="center"|1 || align="center"| || 3 || 13 || 2 || 1 || 2 || 4.3 || 0.7 || 0.3 || 0.7 || align=center|
|-
|align="left"| || align="center"|F/C || align="left"|Hawaii || align="center"|1 || align="center"| || 5 || 16 || 6 || 0 || 8 || 3.2 || 1.2 || 0.0 || 1.6 || align=center|
|-
|align="left" bgcolor="#FFFF99"|^ || align="center"|F || align="left"|Auburn || align="center"|4 || align="center"|– || 183 || 6,398 || 2,235 || 720 || 3,017 || 35.0 || 12.2 || 3.9 || 16.5 || align=center|
|-
|align="left"| || align="center"|F || align="left"|Northeastern || align="center"|1 || align="center"| || 22 || 126 || 26 || 5 || 43 || 5.7 || 1.2 || 0.2 || 2.0 || align=center|
|-
|align="left"| || align="center"|G/F || align="left"|Oregon || align="center"|3 || align="center"|– || 207 || 5,519 || 822 || 760 || 2,794 || 26.7 || 4.0 || 3.7 || 13.5 || align=center|
|-
|align="left"| || align="center"|G || align="left"|Tennessee State || align="center"|1 || align="center"| || 75 || 1,883 || 173 || 259 || 744 || 25.1 || 2.3 || 3.5 || 9.9 || align=center|
|-
|align="left"| || align="center"|G || align="left"|Seton Hall || align="center"|1 || align="center"| || 27 || 314 || 19 || 42 || 56 || 11.6 || 0.7 || 1.6 || 2.1 || align=center|
|-
|align="left"| || align="center"|G || align="left"|Oregon State || align="center"|1 || align="center"| || 56 || 857 || 94 || 78 || 208 || 15.3 || 1.7 || 1.4 || 3.7 || align=center|
|-
|align="left"| || align="center"|G || align="left"|Georgia Tech || align="center"|2 || align="center"|– || 73 || 1,572 || 169 || 165 || 458 || 21.5 || 2.3 || 2.3 || 6.3 || align=center|
|-
|align="left" bgcolor="#FFFF99"|^ || align="center"|F || align="left"|Miami (FL) || align="center"|2 || align="center"|– || 152 || 4,382 || 513 || 770 || 1,948 || 28.8 || 3.4 || 5.1 || 12.8 || align=center|
|-
|align="left"| || align="center"|F || align="left"|Duke || align="center"|5 || align="center"|– || 348 || 11,912 || 1,623 || 784 || 3,052 || 34.2 || 4.7 || 2.3 || 8.8 || align=center|
|-
|align="left"| || align="center"|F || align="left"|Maryland || align="center"|1 || align="center"| || 23 || 281 || 84 || 2 || 82 || 12.2 || 3.7 || 0.1 || 3.6 || align=center|
|-
|align="left"| || align="center"|F || align="left"|Kansas State || align="center"|1 || align="center"| || 20 || 363 || 98 || 16 || 255 || 18.2 || 4.9 || 0.8 || 12.8 || align=center|
|-
|align="left"| || align="center"|F/C || align="left"|Minnesota || align="center"|1 || align="center"| || 3 || 33 || 7 || 2 || 14 || 11.0 || 2.3 || 0.7 || 4.7 || align=center|
|-
|align="left"| || align="center"|G || align="left"|Notre Dame || align="center"|1 || align="center"| || 4 || 16 || 1 || 4 || 10 || 4.0 || 0.3 || 1.0 || 2.5 || align=center|
|-
|align="left"| || align="center"|F || align="left"|St. John's || align="center"|1 || align="center"| || 40 || 799 || 152 || 57 || 350 || 20.0 || 3.8 || 1.4 || 8.8 || align=center|
|-
|align="left"| || align="center"|G || align="left"|Arkansas || align="center"|5 || align="center"|– || 291 || 8,290 || 1,185 || 980 || 2,708 || 28.5 || 4.1 || 3.4 || 9.3 || align=center|
|-
|align="left"| || align="center"|F/C || align="left"|Kansas || align="center"|2 || align="center"| || 76 || 929 || 290 || 21 || 285 || 12.2 || 3.8 || 0.3 || 3.8 || align=center|
|-
|align="left"| || align="center"|F/C || align="left"|USC || align="center"|4 || align="center"|– || 285 || 7,910 || 2,325 || 447 || 4,138 || 27.8 || 8.2 || 1.6 || 14.5 || align=center|
|-
|align="left"| || align="center"|G/F || align="left"|Kentucky || align="center"|1 || align="center"| || 33 || 1,064 || 149 || 83 || 281 || 32.2 || 4.5 || 2.5 || 8.5 || align=center|
|-
|align="left"| || align="center"|G || align="left"|Louisville || align="center"|1 || align="center"| || 7 || 21 || 4 || 2 || 4 || 3.0 || 0.6 || 0.3 || 0.6 || align=center|
|-
|align="left"| || align="center"|G || align="left"|Missouri || align="center"|1 || align="center"| || 11 || 131 || 9 || 21 || 44 || 11.9 || 0.8 || 1.9 || 4.0 || align=center|
|-
|align="left"| || align="center"|F || align="left"|Iowa || align="center"|2 || align="center"|– || 134 || 1,256 || 164 || 42 || 199 || 9.4 || 1.2 || 0.3 || 1.5 || align=center|
|-
|align="left"| || align="center"|G/F || align="left"|Oklahoma || align="center"|1 || align="center"| || 66 || 918 || 118 || 96 || 284 || 13.9 || 1.8 || 1.5 || 4.3 || align=center|
|-
|align="left"| || align="center"|G || align="left"|Eastern Michigan || align="center"|1 || align="center"| || 8 || 111 || 11 || 17 || 39 || 13.9 || 1.4 || 2.1 || 4.9 || align=center|
|-
|align="left"| || align="center"|F || align="left"|Texas Southern || align="center"|3 || align="center"|– || 99 || 1,139 || 151 || 74 || 440 || 11.5 || 1.5 || 0.7 || 4.4 || align=center|
|-
|align="left"| || align="center"|G || align="left"|Texas || align="center"|1 || align="center"| || 17 || 391 || 39 || 32 || 88 || 23.0 || 2.3 || 1.9 || 5.2 || align=center|
|-
|align="left"| || align="center"|F || align="left"|Xavier || align="center"|2 || align="center"|– || 18 || 156 || 46 || 6 || 40 || 8.7 || 2.6 || 0.3 || 2.2 || align=center|
|-
|align="left"| || align="center"|F || align="left"|Wyoming || align="center"|2 || align="center"|– || 96 || 910 || 94 || 39 || 289 || 9.5 || 1.0 || 0.4 || 3.0 || align=center|
|-
|align="left"| || align="center"|G/F || align="left"|Florida || align="center"|3 || align="center"|– || 196 || 3,999 || 516 || 265 || 1,498 || 20.4 || 2.6 || 1.4 || 7.6 || align=center|
|-
|align="left"| || align="center"|G/F || align="left"|Arkansas || align="center"|1 || align="center"| || 23 || 158 || 14 || 10 || 7 || 6.9 || 0.6 || 0.4 || 0.3 || align=center|
|-
|align="left"| || align="center"|G || align="left"|Johnson C. Smith || align="center"|1 || align="center"| || 11 || 84 || 15 || 12 || 28 || 7.6 || 1.4 || 1.1 || 2.5 || align=center|
|-
|align="left"| || align="center"|G || align="left"|Oregon || align="center"|6 || align="center"|–– || 297 || 7,090 || 543 || 977 || 3,465 || 23.9 || 1.8 || 3.3 || 11.7 || align=center|
|-
|align="left"| || align="center"|G || align="left"|Houston || align="center"|2 || align="center"|– || 61 || 1,210 || 149 || 79 || 477 || 19.8 || 2.4 || 1.3 || 7.8 || align=center|
|-
|align="left"| || align="center"|G || align="left"|UC Irvine || align="center"|3 || align="center"|– || 183 || 2,927 || 214 || 414 || 996 || 16.0 || 1.2 || 2.3 || 5.4 || align=center|
|-
|align="left"| || align="center"|G || align="left"|Cal State Fullerton || align="center"|2 || align="center"|– || 45 || 238 || 13 || 25 || 112 || 5.3 || 0.3 || 0.6 || 2.5 || align=center|
|-
|align="left"| || align="center"|F || align="left"|NC State || align="center"|2 || align="center"|– || 123 || 2,833 || 630 || 119 || 954 || 23.0 || 5.1 || 1.0 || 7.8 || align=center|
|-
|align="left"| || align="center"|G || align="left"|Oklahoma State || align="center"|1 || align="center"| || 4 || 31 || 5 || 2 || 5 || 7.8 || 1.3 || 0.5 || 1.3 || align=center|
|-
|align="left" bgcolor="#CCFFCC"|x || align="center"|G || align="left"|SMU || align="center"|1 || align="center"| || 51 || 1,229 || 224 || 72 || 416 || 24.1 || 4.4 || 1.4 || 8.2 || align=center|
|-
|align="left"| || align="center"|G || align="left"|McNeese State || align="center"|1 || align="center"| || 40 || 403 || 42 || 70 || 123 || 10.1 || 1.1 || 1.8 || 3.1 || align=center|
|-
|align="left"| || align="center"|G/F || align="left"|Arkansas || align="center"|1 || align="center"| || 14 || 91 || 15 || 5 || 36 || 6.5 || 1.1 || 0.4 || 2.6 || align=center|
|-
|align="left"| || align="center"|G || align="left"|Temple || align="center"|1 || align="center"| || 23 || 215 || 20 || 33 || 44 || 9.3 || 0.9 || 1.4 || 1.9 || align=center|
|-
|align="left"| || align="center"|F/C || align="left"|La Salle || align="center"|1 || align="center"| || 81 || 2,055 || 277 || 186 || 812 || 25.4 || 3.4 || 2.3 || 10.0 || align=center|
|-
|align="left"| || align="center"|F/C || align="left"|Seton Hall || align="center"|1 || align="center"| || 71 || 1,587 || 351 || 52 || 611 || 22.4 || 4.9 || 0.7 || 8.6 || align=center|
|-
|align="left"| || align="center"|F || align="left"|Arizona || align="center"|3 || align="center"|– || 210 || 4,524 || 718 || 289 || 1,980 || 21.5 || 3.4 || 1.4 || 9.4 || align=center|
|-
|align="left"| || align="center"|F || align="left"|Iowa || align="center"|9 || align="center"|––  || 538 || 8,074 || 1,116 || 501 || 2,991 || 15.0 || 2.1 || 0.9 || 5.6 || align=center|
|}

C

|-
|align="left"| || align="center"|F/C || align="left"| Pinheiros || align="center"|2 || align="center"|– || 14 || 88 || 30 || 3 || 45 || 6.3 || 2.1 || 0.2 || 3.2 || align=center|
|-
|align="left"||| align="center"|F/C || align="left"|Lamar || align="center"|3 || align="center"|– || 100 || 704 || 219 || 15 || 179 || 7.0 || 2.2 || 0.2 || 1.8 || align=center|
|-
|align="left"| || align="center"|F/C || align="left"|UMass || align="center"|1 || align="center"| || 19 || 458 || 176 || 32 || 135 || 24.1 || 9.3 || 1.7 || 7.1 || align=center|
|-
|align="left"| || align="center"|G || align="left"|Murray State || align="center"|3 || align="center"|– || 48 || 625 || 58 || 51 || 255 || 13.0 || 1.2 || 1.1 || 5.3 || align=center|
|-
|align="left"| || align="center"|C || align="left"| Élan Chalon || align="center"|6 || align="center"|– || 334 || 8,674 || 3,243 || 324 || 4,075 || 26.0 || 9.7 || 1.0 || 12.2 || align=center|
|-
|align="left"| || align="center"|F/C || align="left"|Wichita State || align="center"|1 || align="center"| || 18 || 152 || 31 || 9 || 47 || 8.4 || 1.7 || 0.5 || 2.6 || align=center|
|-
|align="left"| || align="center"|F || align="left"|Missouri || align="center"|2 || align="center"|– || 14 || 166 || 24 || 16 || 54 || 11.9 || 1.7 || 1.1 || 3.9 || align=center|
|-
|align="left"| || align="center"|F/C || align="left"|Purdue || align="center"|1 || align="center"| || 63 || 1,596 || 396 || 94 || 759 || 25.3 || 6.3 || 1.5 || 12.0 || align=center|
|-
|align="left"| || align="center"|G || align="left"|Syracuse || align="center"|1 || align="center"| || 16 || 145 || 13 || 21 || 69 || 9.1 || 0.8 || 1.3 || 4.3 || align=center|
|-
|align="left"| || align="center"|G || align="left"|Florida State || align="center"|3 || align="center"|– || 209 || 4,686 || 533 || 875 || 2,109 || 22.4 || 2.6 || 4.2 || 10.1 || align=center|
|-
|align="left"| || align="center"|F || align="left"| Maccabi Tel Aviv || align="center"|1 || align="center"| || 71 || 1,283 || 260 || 88 || 490 || 18.1 || 3.7 || 1.2 || 6.9 || align=center|
|-
|align="left"| || align="center"|C || align="left"|Iowa State || align="center"|5 || align="center"|– || 317 || 7,112 || 1,955 || 158 || 1,975 || 22.4 || 6.2 || 0.5 || 6.2 || align=center|
|-
|align="left"| || align="center"|C || align="left"|Dominguez High School (CA) || align="center"|1 || align="center"| || 26 || 219 || 66 || 6 || 34 || 8.4 || 2.5 || 0.2 || 1.3 || align=center|
|-
|align="left"| || align="center"|F || align="left"|Missouri || align="center"|2 || align="center"|– || 122 || 2,031 || 331 || 104 || 994 || 16.6 || 2.7 || 0.9 || 8.1 || align=center|
|-
|align="left"| || align="center"|F/C || align="left"|North Carolina || align="center"|2 || align="center"|– || 142 || 1,998 || 473 || 92 || 558 || 14.1 || 3.3 || 0.6 || 3.9 || align=center|
|-
|align="left"| || align="center"|G || align="left"|Florida || align="center"|1 || align="center"| || 7 || 33 || 4 || 4 || 6 || 4.7 || 0.6 || 0.6 || 0.9 || align=center|
|-
|align="left"| || align="center"|F || align="left"|Washington || align="center"|1 || align="center"| || 16 || 104 || 28 || 6 || 29 || 6.5 || 1.8 || 0.4 || 1.8 || align=center|
|-
|align="left" bgcolor="#CCFFCC"|x || align="center"|G || align="left"|Arizona State || align="center"|1 || align="center"| || 74 || 1,334 || 186 || 150 || 587 || 18.0 || 2.5 || 2.0 || 7.9 || align=center|
|-
|align="left"| || align="center"|F || align="left"|Cincinnati || align="center"|2 || align="center"|– || 69 || 853 || 156 || 30 || 218 || 12.4 || 2.3 || 0.4 || 3.2 || align=center|
|-
|align="left"| || align="center"|G || align="left"|Campbell || align="center"|1 || align="center"| || 33 || 291 || 30 || 27 || 161 || 8.8 || 0.9 || 0.8 || 4.9 || align=center|
|-
|align="left"| || align="center"|F || align="left"|Houston Baptist || align="center"|2 || align="center"| || 64 || 1,114 || 259 || 77 || 314 || 17.4 || 4.0 || 1.2 || 4.9 || align=center|
|-
|align="left"| || align="center"|C || align="left"|Georgia Tech || align="center"|3 || align="center"|– || 61 || 691 || 148 || 16 || 213 || 11.3 || 2.4 || 0.3 || 3.5 || align=center|
|-
|align="left"| || align="center"|G || align="left"|Charlotte || align="center"|1 || align="center"| || 10 || 30 || 3 || 7 || 15 || 3.0 || 0.3 || 0.7 || 1.5 || align=center|
|-
|align="left"| || align="center"|G || align="left"|Oregon State || align="center"|1 || align="center"| || 52 || 399 || 38 || 59 || 132 || 7.7 || 0.7 || 1.1 || 2.5 || align=center|
|-
|align="left"| || align="center"|G || align="left"|Washington || align="center"|1 || align="center"| || 5 || 36 || 3 || 7 || 6 || 7.2 || 0.6 || 1.4 || 1.2 || align=center|
|-
|align="left"| || align="center"|F || align="left"|Illinois || align="center"|2 || align="center"|– || 24 || 69 || 14 || 2 || 33 || 2.9 || 0.6 || 0.1 || 1.4 || align=center|
|-
|align="left"| || align="center"|G || align="left"|Ohio State || align="center"|1 || align="center"| || 16 || 165 || 18 || 10 || 55 || 10.3 || 1.1 || 0.6 || 3.4 || align=center|
|-
|align="left"| || align="center"|C || align="left"|Kentucky || align="center"|1 || align="center"| || 25 || 506 || 191 || 60 || 241 || 20.2 || 7.6 || 2.4 || 9.6 || align=center|
|-
|align="left"| || align="center"|F || align="left"|Tennessee State || align="center"|2 || align="center"|– || 29 || 760 || 181 || 32 || 271 || 26.2 || 6.2 || 1.1|| 9.3 || align=center|
|-
|align="left"| || align="center"|C || align="left"|Murray State || align="center"|1 || align="center"| || 63 || 720 || 243 || 57 || 171 || 11.4 || 3.9 || 0.9 || 2.7 || align=center|
|-
|align="left"| || align="center"|F/C || align="left"|Detroit Mercy || align="center"|1 || align="center"| || 2 || 30 || 12 || 0 || 4 || 15.0 || 6.0 || 0.0 || 2.0 || align=center|
|-
|align="left"| || align="center"|F || align="left"|Boston College || align="center"|1 || align="center"| || 4 || 50 || 8 || 0 || 12 || 12.5 || 2.0 || 0.0 || 3.0 || align=center|
|}

D to E

|-
|align="left"| || align="center"|C || align="left"|Seton Hall || align="center"|1 || align="center"| || 65 || 1,446 || 456 || 33 || 490 || 22.2 || 7.0 || 0.5 || 7.5 || align=center|
|-
|align="left"| || align="center"|G || align="left"|VCU || align="center"|2 || align="center"|– || 22 || 183 || 10 || 9 || 88 || 8.3 || 0.5 || 0.4 || 4.0 || align=center|
|-
|align="left"| || align="center"|G || align="left"|Delaware State || align="center"|2 || align="center"|– || 58 || 829 || 69 || 85 || 249 || 14.3 || 1.2 || 1.5 || 4.3 || align=center|
|-
|align="left"| || align="center"|F/C || align="left"|Colorado || align="center"|1 || align="center"| || 12 || 180 || 44 || 5 || 62 || 15.0 || 3.7 || 0.4 || 5.2 || align=center|
|-
|align="left"| || align="center"|F || align="left"|Wyoming || align="center"|1 || align="center"| || 1 || 0 || 0 || 0 || 0 || 0.0 || 0.0 || 0.0 || 0.0 || align=center|
|-
|align="left"| || align="center"|F || align="left"|Wisconsin || align="center"|2 || align="center"|– || 80 || 1,425 || 285 || 76 || 504 || 17.8 || 3.6 || 1.0 || 6.3 || align=center|
|-
|align="left"| || align="center"|G || align="left"|Argentina || align="center"|1 || align="center"| || 67 || 1,689 || 220 || 135 || 708 || 25.2 || 3.3 || 2.0 || 10.6 || align=center|
|-
|align="left"| || align="center"|G/F || align="left"|Arizona || align="center"|1 || align="center"| || 50 || 1,558 || 83 || 95 || 547 || 31.2 || 1.7 || 1.9 || 10.9 || align=center|
|-
|align="left"| || align="center"|G || align="left"|Charlotte || align="center"|1 || align="center"| || 33 || 362 || 40 || 75 || 115 || 11.0 || 1.2 || 2.3 || 3.5 || align=center|
|-
|align="left"| || align="center"|F || align="left"|Georgia || align="center"|1 || align="center"| || 20 || 108 || 23 || 2 || 56 || 5.4 || 1.2 || 0.1 || 2.8 || align=center|
|-
|align="left"| || align="center"|F || align="left"|Memphis || align="center"|3 || align="center"|– || 79 || 914 || 305 || 28 || 197 || 11.6 || 3.9 || 0.4 || 2.5 || align=center|
|-
|align="left"| || align="center"|G || align="left"|Florida State || align="center"|1 || align="center"| || 49 || 913 || 90 || 93 || 399 || 18.6 || 1.8 || 1.9 || 8.1 || align=center|
|-
|align="left"| || align="center"|G || align="left"|Slovenia || align="center"|2 || align="center"|– || 88 || 2,130 || 224 || 406 || 945 || 24.2 || 2.5 || 4.6 || 10.7 || align=center|
|-
|align="left"| || align="center"|G || align="left"|Valparaiso || align="center"|2 || align="center"|– || 106 || 1,734 || 135 || 214 || 538 || 16.4 || 1.3 || 2.0 || 5.1 || align=center|
|-
|align="left" bgcolor="#FFFF99"|^ (#22) || align="center"|G || align="left"|Houston || align="center"|4 || align="center"|– || 219 || 8,041 || 1,338 || 1,192 || 4,155 || 36.7 || 6.1 || 5.4 || 19.0 || align=center|
|-
|align="left"| || align="center"|G || align="left"|South Carolina || align="center"|5 || align="center"|– || 280 || 5,548 || 459 || 1,051 || 2,341 || 19.8 || 1.6 || 3.8 || 8.4 || align=center|
|-
|align="left"| || align="center"|F || align="left"|Purdue || align="center"|1 || align="center"| || 2 || 16 || 2 || 0 || 3 || 8.0 || 1.0 || 0.0 || 1.5 || align=center|
|-
|align="left"| || align="center"|G || align="left"|Providence || align="center"|2 || align="center"|– || 74 || 851 || 57 || 105 || 181 || 11.5 || 0.8 || 1.4 || 2.4 || align=center|
|-
|align="left"| || align="center"|G/F || align="left"|Washington State || align="center"|3 || align="center"|– || 88 || 451 || 80 || 61 || 208 || 5.1 || 0.9 || 0.7 || 2.4 || align=center|
|-
|align="left"| || align="center"|G/F || align="left"|American International || align="center"|5 || align="center"|– || 344 || 9,562 || 923 || 1,066 || 3,356 || 27.8 || 2.7 || 3.1 || 9.8 || align=center|
|-
|align="left"| || align="center"|F || align="left"|Long Beach State || align="center"|1 || align="center"| || 40 || 949 || 117 || 27 || 294 || 23.7 || 2.9 || 0.7 || 7.4 || align=center|
|-
|align="left"| || align="center"|G || align="left"|Syracuse || align="center"|1 || align="center"| || 31 || 196 || 19 || 34 || 58 || 6.3 || 0.6 || 1.1 || 1.9 || align=center|
|}

F to G

|-
|align="left"| || align="center"|F || align="left"|Morehead State || align="center"|1 || align="center"| || 25 || 610 || 206 || 18 || 323 || 24.4 || 8.2 || 0.7 || 12.9 || align=center|
|-
|align="left"| || align="center"|C || align="left"|UTEP || align="center"|2 || align="center"| || 114 || 870 || 217 || 30 || 366 || 7.6 || 1.9 || 0.3 || 3.2 || align=center|
|-
|align="left"| || align="center"|C || align="left"|Dayton || align="center"|2 || align="center"|– || 88 || 1,448 || 482 || 93 || 744 || 16.5 || 5.5 || 1.1 || 8.5 || align=center|
|-
|align="left"| || align="center"|G || align="left"|Georgetown || align="center"|6 || align="center"|– || 439 || 11,631 || 1,104 || 2,363 || 5,030 || 26.5 || 2.5 || 5.4 || 11.5 || align=center|
|-
|align="left"| || align="center"|G || align="left"|Syracuse || align="center"|1 || align="center"| || 11 || 135 || 8 || 28 || 37 || 12.3 || 0.7 || 2.5 || 3.4 || align=center|
|-
|align="left"| || align="center"|F || align="left"|Houston || align="center"|1 || align="center"| || 9 || 41 || 11 || 3 || 15 || 4.6 || 1.2 || 0.3 || 1.7 || align=center|
|-
|align="left"| || align="center"|G || align="left"|North Carolina || align="center"|2 || align="center"|– || 106 || 2,310 || 164 || 471 || 616 || 21.8 || 1.5 || 4.4 || 5.8 || align=center|
|-
|align="left"| || align="center"|G || align="left"|Arkansas || align="center"|1 || align="center"| || 6 || 49 || 7 || 5 || 18 || 8.2 || 1.2 || 0.8 || 3.0 || align=center|
|-
|align="left"| || align="center"|G || align="left"|Gonzaga || align="center"|1 || align="center"| || 8 || 117 || 10 || 6 || 42 || 14.6 || 1.3 || 0.8 || 5.3 || align=center|
|-
|align="left" bgcolor="#FFCC00"|+ || align="center"|G || align="left"|Maryland || align="center"|6 || align="center"|– || 384 || 15,024 || 2,318 || 2,411 || 7,281 || 39.1 || 6.0 || 6.3 || 19.0 || align=center|
|-
|align="left"| || align="center"|G || align="left"|Guilford || align="center"|1 || align="center"| || 58 || 682 || 44 || 60 || 374 || 11.8 || 0.8 || 1.0 || 6.4 || align=center|
|-
|align="left"| || align="center"|G || align="left"|Louisville || align="center"|1 || align="center"| || 10 || 108 || 11 || 3 || 26 || 10.8 || 1.1 || 0.3 || 2.6 || align=center|
|-
|align="left"| || align="center"|F || align="left"|Oregon State || align="center"|1 || align="center"| || 80 || 1,755 || 464 || 93 || 1,071 || 21.9 || 5.8 || 1.2 || 13.4 || align=center|
|-
|align="left"| || align="center"|G/F || align="left"|Louisville || align="center"|3 || align="center"|– || 87 || 1,602 || 162 || 98 || 475 || 18.4 || 1.9 || 1.1 || 5.5 || align=center|
|-
|align="left"| || align="center"|G || align="left"|Missouri State || align="center"|1 || align="center"| || 66 || 1,004 || 108 || 138 || 391 || 15.2 || 1.6 || 2.1 || 5.9 || align=center|
|-
|align="left"| || align="center"|F || align="left"|Oral Roberts || align="center"|3 || align="center"|– || 125 || 2,530 || 365 || 211 || 667 || 20.2 || 2.9 || 1.7 || 5.3 || align=center|
|-
|align="left"| || align="center"|G/F || align="left"|UTEP || align="center"|2 || align="center"|– || 65 || 759 || 140 || 52 || 235 || 11.7 || 2.2 || 0.8 || 3.6 || align=center|
|-
|align="left"| || align="center"|C || align="left"|Evansville || align="center"|1 || align="center"| || 1 || 2 || 0 || 0 || 0 || 2.0 || 0.0 || 0.0 || 0.0 || align=center|
|-
|align="left" bgcolor="#CCFFCC"|x || align="center"|G || align="left"|Indiana || align="center"|3 || align="center"|– || 212 || 6,635 || 519 || 471 || 3,563 || 31.3 || 2.4 || 2.2 || 16.8 || align=center|
|-
|align="left"| || align="center"|G || align="left"|College of Charleston || align="center"|1 || align="center"| || 8 || 50 || 2 || 4 || 22 || 6.3 || 0.3 || 0.5 || 2.8 || align=center|
|-
|align="left"| || align="center"|G || align="left"|Oklahoma State || align="center"|1 || align="center"| || 6 || 38 || 7 || 3 || 17 || 6.3 || 1.2 || 0.5 || 2.8 || align=center|
|-
|align="left"| || align="center"|F || align="left"|Clemson || align="center"|1 || align="center"| || 21 || 124 || 25 || 5 || 49 || 5.9 || 1.2 || 0.2 || 2.3 || align=center|
|-
|align="left" bgcolor="#CCFFCC"|x || align="center"|G/F || align="left"|Gulf Shores Academy (TX) || align="center"|3 || align="center"|– || 115 || 2,406 || 317 || 65 || 1,178 || 20.9 || 2.8 || 0.6 || 10.2 || align=center|
|-
|align="left"| || align="center"|F/C || align="left"|Michigan State || align="center"|1 || align="center"| || 42 || 1,073 || 423 || 59 || 582 || 25.5 || 10.1 || 1.4 || 13.9 || align=center|
|-
|align="left"| || align="center"|G/F || align="left"|Seton Hall || align="center"|1 || align="center"| || 19 || 133 || 19 || 10 || 11 || 7.0 || 1.0 || 0.5 || 0.6 || align=center|
|-
|align="left"| || align="center"|F/C || align="left"|Seton Hall || align="center"|2 || align="center"|– || 150 || 3,786 || 877 || 139 || 1,306 || 25.2 || 5.8 || 0.9 || 8.7 || align=center|
|-
|align="left"| || align="center"|G/F || align="left"|Saint Joseph's || align="center"|1 || align="center"| || 39 || 1,007 || 60 || 133 || 207 || 25.8 || 1.5 || 3.4 || 5.3 || align=center|
|}

H

|-
|align="left"| || align="center"|G/F || align="left"|Texas || align="center"|1 || align="center"| || 21 || 349 || 61 || 18 || 138 || 16.6 || 2.9 || 0.9 || 6.6 || align=center|
|-
|align="left"| || align="center"|C || align="left"|Pittsburgh || align="center"|1 || align="center"| || 22 || 273 || 90 || 15 || 82 || 12.4 || 4.1 || 0.7 || 3.7 || align=center|
|-
|align="left" bgcolor="#FBCEB1"|* || align="center"|G || align="left"|Arizona State || align="center"|7 || align="center"|– || 545 || 20,233 || 3,249 || 4,201 || 15,832 || 37.1 || 6.0 || 7.7 || bgcolor="#CFECEC"|29.0 || align=center|
|-
|align="left"| || align="center"|F/C || align="left"|Louisville || align="center"|2 || align="center"|– || 97 || 1,443 || 284 || 81 || 667 || 14.9 || 2.9 || 0.8 || 6.9 || align=center|
|-
|align="left"| || align="center"|F/C || align="left"|Georgetown || align="center"|3 || align="center"|– || 156 || 2,666 || 651 || 57 || 1,023 || 17.1 || 4.2 || 0.4 || 6.6 || align=center|
|-
|align="left"| || align="center"|F || align="left"|Rice || align="center"|3 || align="center"|– || 29 || 257 || 79 || 7 || 95 || 8.9 || 2.7 || 0.2 || 3.3 || align=center|
|-
|align="left"| || align="center"|G || align="left"|Tulsa || align="center"|3 || align="center"|– || 145 || 1,855 || 248 || 167 || 953 || 12.8 || 1.7 || 1.2 || 6.6 || align=center|
|-
|align="left" bgcolor="#CCFFCC"|x || align="center"|F || align="left"|Germany || align="center"|1 || align="center"| || 28 || 221 || 47 || 15 || 53 || 7.9 || 1.7 || 0.5 || 1.9 || align=center|
|-
|align="left"| || align="center"|F/C || align="left"|Washington || align="center"|2 || align="center"|– || 61 || 948 || 293 || 98 || 335 || 15.5 || 4.8 || 1.6 || 5.5 || align=center|
|-
|align="left"| || align="center"|G/F || align="left"|Long Beach State || align="center"|1 || align="center"| || 58 || 685 || 78 || 47 || 134 || 11.8 || 1.3 || 0.8 || 2.3 || align=center|
|-
|align="left"| || align="center"|F/C || align="left"|Kentucky || align="center"|7 || align="center"|– || 426 || 8,558 || 2,449 || 537 || 1,858 || 20.1 || 5.7 || 1.3 || 4.4 || align=center|
|-
|align="left" bgcolor="#FFFF99"|^ || align="center"|F/C || align="left"|Houston || align="center"|7 || align="center"|–– || 572 || 20,782 || 6,974 || 1,104 || 11,762 || 36.3 || 12.2 || 1.9 || 20.6 || align=center|
|-
|align="left"| || align="center"|G || align="left"|Illinois || align="center"|4 || align="center"|– || 255 || 6,222 || 680 || 582 || 2,242 || 24.4 || 2.7 || 2.3 || 8.8 || align=center|
|-
|align="left"| || align="center"|F || align="left"|Texas || align="center"|1 || align="center"| || 4 || 14 || 2 || 0 || 8 || 3.5 || 0.5 || 0.0 || 2.0 || align=center|
|-
|align="left"| || align="center"|G || align="left"|VCU || align="center"|1 || align="center"| || 8 || 34 || 2 || 5 || 12 || 4.3 || 0.3 || 0.6 || 1.5 || align=center|
|-
|align="left"| || align="center"|G || align="left"|Hawaii || align="center"|4 || align="center"|– || 258 || 5,472 || 422 || 1,025 || 1,446 || 21.2 || 1.6 || 4.0 || 5.6 || align=center|
|-
|align="left"| || align="center"|G || align="left"|UC Santa Barbara || align="center"|1 || align="center"| || 18 || 92 || 7 || 8 || 24 || 5.1 || 0.4 || 0.4 || 1.3 || align=center|
|-
|align="left"| || align="center"|F || align="left"|Houston || align="center"|4 || align="center"|– || 260 || 4,989 || 1,116 || 169 || 1,564 || 19.2 || 4.3 || 0.7 || 6.0 || align=center|
|-
|align="left"| || align="center"|F || align="left"|Tulane || align="center"|1 || align="center"| || 2 || 7 || 1 || 1 || 0 || 3.5 || 0.5 || 0.5 || 0.0 || align=center|
|-
|align="left"| || align="center"|F/C || align="left"|Arizona || align="center"|3 || align="center"|– || 127 || 1,966 || 575 || 56 || 714 || 15.5 || 4.5 || 0.4 || 5.6 || align=center|
|-
|align="left"| || align="center"|G || align="left"|Arizona State || align="center"|1 || align="center"| || 80 || 1,950 || 173 || 417 || 609 || 24.4 || 2.2 || 5.2 || 7.6 || align=center|
|-
|align="left"| || align="center"|F || align="left"|Alabama || align="center"|4 || align="center"|– || 295 || 9,408 || 1,568 || 919 || 3,109 || 31.9 || 5.3 || 3.1 || 10.5 || align=center|
|-
|align="left" bgcolor="#CCFFCC"|x || align="center"|G || align="left"|Texas A&M || align="center"|1 || align="center"| || 39 || 979 || 140 || 40 || 366 || 25.1 || 3.6 || 1.0 || 9.4 || align=center|
|-
|align="left" bgcolor="#FFCC00"|+ || align="center"|C || align="left"|SACA (GA) || align="center"|3 || align="center"|– || 183 || 5,899 || 2,132 || 279 || 2,919 || 32.2 || 11.7 || 1.5 || 16.0 || align=center|
|-
|align="left"| || align="center"|F || align="left"|Michigan || align="center"|3 || align="center"|– || 221 || 6,284 || 1,351 || 337 || 2,300 || 28.4 || 6.1 || 1.5 || 10.4 || align=center|
|-
|align="left"| || align="center"|G || align="left"|Georgia State || align="center"|1 || align="center"| || 5 || 45 || 5 || 3 || 19 || 9.0 || 1.0 || 0.6 || 3.8 || align=center|
|}

J

|-
|align="left"| || align="center"|G || align="left"|Duquesne || align="center"|1 || align="center"| || 1 || 35 || 3 || 1 || 8 || 35.0 || 3.0 || 1.0 || 8.0 || align=center|
|-
|align="left"| || align="center"|G || align="left"|Minnesota || align="center"|1 || align="center"| || 26 || 498 || 71 || 63 || 228 || 19.2 || 2.7 || 2.4 || 8.8 || align=center|
|-
|align="left"| || align="center"|G || align="left"|Notre Dame || align="center"|1 || align="center"| || 12 || 63 || 11 || 5 || 8 || 5.3 || 0.9 || 0.4 || 0.7 || align=center|
|-
|align="left"| || align="center"|G/F || align="left"|Georgetown || align="center"|1 || align="center"| || 4 || 33 || 3 || 0 || 8 || 8.3 || 0.8 || 0.0 || 2.0 || align=center|
|-
|align="left"| || align="center"|G || align="left"|Ohio State || align="center"|2 || align="center"|– || 104 || 4,109 || 602 || 312 || 1,353 || 39.5 || 5.8 || 3.0 || 13.0 || align=center|
|-
|align="left"| || align="center"|G || align="left"|St. John's || align="center"|1 || align="center"| || 42 || 577 || 70 || 119 || 103 || 13.7 || 1.7 || 2.8 || 2.5 || align=center|
|-
|align="left"| || align="center"|G/F || align="left"|Ohio || align="center"|2 || align="center"|– || 85 || 580 || 73 || 60 || 304 || 6.8 || 0.9 || 0.7 || 3.6 || align=center|
|-
|align="left"| || align="center"|F || align="left"|St. Mary's (TX) || align="center"|1 || align="center"| || 7 || 58 || 6 || 2 || 30 || 8.3 || 0.9 || 0.3 || 4.3 || align=center|
|-
|align="left"| || align="center"|G || align="left"|Duquesne || align="center"|2 || align="center"| || 60 || 1,229 || 138 || 132 || 551 || 20.5 || 2.3 || 2.2 || 9.2 || align=center|
|-
|align="left"| || align="center"|F || align="left"|Indiana || align="center"|2 || align="center"|– || 36 || 470 || 100 || 29 || 115 || 13.1 || 2.8 || 0.8 || 3.2 || align=center|
|-
|align="left"| || align="center"|F || align="left"|Ohio State || align="center"|1 || align="center"| || 3 || 78 || 15 || 7 || 31 || 26.0 || 5.0 || 2.3 || 10.3 || align=center|
|-
|align="left"| || align="center"|G || align="left"|Southern || align="center"|1 || align="center"| || 49 || 772 || 45 || 166 || 251 || 15.8 || 0.9 || 3.4 || 5.1 || align=center|
|-
|align="left"| || align="center"|F || align="left"|Alabama || align="center"|6 || align="center"|– || 432 || 10,562 || 1,565 || 767 || 4,139 || 24.4 || 3.6 || 1.8 || 9.6 || align=center|
|-
|align="left"| || align="center"|G/F || align="left"|Illinois || align="center"|3 || align="center"|– || 102 || 2,115 || 253 || 124 || 922 || 20.7 || 2.5 || 1.2 || 9.0 || align=center|
|-
|align="left"| || align="center"|G || align="left"|Wake Forest || align="center"|1 || align="center"| || 67 || 879 || 79 || 181 || 294 || 13.1 || 1.2 || 2.7 || 4.4 || align=center|
|-
|align="left"| || align="center"|C || align="left"|Stephen F. Austin || align="center"|2 || align="center"|– || 45 || 407 || 106 || 12 || 97 || 9.0 || 2.4 || 0.3 || 2.2 || align=center|
|-
|align="left"| || align="center"|G/F || align="left"|Arkansas || align="center"|1 || align="center"| || 23 || 505 || 65 || 38 || 139 || 22.0 || 2.8 || 1.7 || 6.0 || align=center|
|-
|align="left"| || align="center"|F || align="left"|Iowa || align="center"|3 || align="center"|– || 147 || 3,234 || 561 || 361 || 1,383 || 22.0 || 3.8 || 2.5 || 9.4 || align=center|
|-
|align="left"| || align="center"|F || align="left"|East Texas State || align="center"|1 || align="center"| || 10 || 80 || 20 || 1 || 17 || 8.0 || 2.0 || 0.1 || 1.7 || align=center|
|-
|align="left"| || align="center"|G || align="left"|Arizona || align="center"|1 || align="center"| || 28 || 262 || 39 || 11 || 74 || 9.4 || 1.4 || 0.4 || 2.6 || align=center|
|-
|align="left"| || align="center"|F || align="left"|Washington || align="center"|1 || align="center"| || 4 || 9 || 1 || 0 || 4 || 2.3 || 0.3 || 0.0 || 1.0 || align=center|
|-
|align="left"| || align="center"|F/C || align="left"|Albany State || align="center"|2 || align="center"|– || 163 || 4,946 || 1,250 || 294 || 1,577 || 30.3 || 7.7 || 1.8 || 9.7 || align=center|
|-
|align="left"| || align="center"|F/C || align="left"|Albany State || align="center"|4 || align="center"|– || 85 || 553 || 118 || 20 || 38 || 6.5 || 1.4 || 0.2 || 0.4 || align=center|
|-
|align="left"| || align="center"|F/C || align="left"|Houston || align="center"|4 || align="center"|– || 258 || 5,208 || 1,325 || 225 || 1,893 || 20.2 || 5.1 || 0.9 || 7.3 || align=center|
|-
|align="left"| || align="center"|F || align="left"|Albany State || align="center"|5 || align="center"|– || 327 || 4,645 || 1,195 || 200 || 1,514 || 14.2 || 3.7 || 0.6 || 4.6 || align=center|
|-
|align="left"| || align="center"|G || align="left"|Oregon || align="center"|1 || align="center"| || 42 || 603 || 67 || 89 || 227 || 14.4 || 1.6 || 2.1 || 5.4 || align=center|
|-
|align="left"| || align="center"|F/C || align="left"|Saint Louis || align="center"|1 || align="center"| || 12 || 66 || 14 || 2 || 26 || 5.5 || 1.2 || 0.2 || 2.2 || align=center|
|-
|align="left"| || align="center"|F || align="left"|Kentucky || align="center"|5 || align="center"|– || 180 || 4,292 || 1,028 || 179 || 1,847 || 23.8 || 5.7 || 1.0 || 10.3 || align=center|
|}

K to L

|-
|align="left"| || align="center"|F/C || align="left"|TCU || align="center"|1 || align="center"| || 32 || 277 || 51 || 6 || 65 || 8.7 || 1.6 || 0.2 || 2.0 || align=center|
|-
|align="left"| || align="center"|F/C || align="left"|UConn || align="center"|4 || align="center"|– || 314 || 6,921 || 2,643 || 394 || 2,300 || 22.0 || 8.4 || 1.3 || 7.3 || align=center|
|-
|align="left"| || align="center"|G || align="left"|Pittsburgh || align="center"|1 || align="center"| || 1 || 3 || 0 || 1 || 0 || 3.0 || 0.0 || 1.0 || 0.0 || align=center|
|-
|align="left"| || align="center"|G || align="left"|Kentucky || align="center"|1 || align="center"| || 12 || 118 || 9 || 9 || 36 || 9.8 || 0.8 || 0.8 || 3.0 || align=center|
|-
|align="left" bgcolor="#FFCC00"|+ || align="center"|F || align="left"|Marquette || align="center"|3 || align="center"|– || 206 || 7,256 || 1,874 || 468 || 4,037 || 35.2 || 9.1 || 2.3 || 19.6 || align=center|
|-
|align="left"| || align="center"|F/C || align="left"|Iowa || align="center"|5 || align="center"|– || 341 || 8,699 || 2,891 || 532 || 3,550 || 25.5 || 8.5 || 1.6 || 10.4 || align=center|
|-
|align="left"| || align="center"|F/C || align="left"|Michigan || align="center"|1 || align="center"| || 49 || 626 || 91 || 50 || 195 || 12.8 || 1.9 || 1.0 || 4.0 || align=center|
|-
|align="left"| || align="center"|C || align="left"|Poland || align="center"|1 || align="center"| || 4 || 12 || 5 || 0 || 4 || 3.0 || 1.3 || 0.0 || 1.0 || align=center|
|-
|align="left"| || align="center"|F || align="left"|Purdue || align="center"|3 || align="center"|– || 163 || 3,593 || 836 || 100 || 1,819 || 22.0 || 5.1 || 0.6 || 11.2 || align=center|
|-
|align="left"| || align="center"|F || align="left"|Vanderbilt || align="center"|2 || align="center"|– || 67 || 675 || 108 || 18 || 197 || 10.1 || 1.6 || 0.3 || 2.9 || align=center|
|-
|align="left"| || align="center"|G || align="left"|Nebraska || align="center"|4 || align="center"|– || 318 || 10,048 || 1,242 || 1,067 || 4,947 || 31.6 || 3.9 || 3.4 || 15.6 || align=center|
|-
|align="left"| || align="center"|G || align="left"|North Carolina || align="center"|1 || align="center"| || 53 || 1,176 || 89 || 180 || 309 || 22.2 || 1.7 || 3.4 || 5.8 || align=center|
|-
|align="left"| || align="center"|G || align="left"|Oklahoma City || align="center"|10 || align="center"|– || 700 || 16,248 || 1,164 || 3,339 || 6,684 || 23.2 || 1.7 || 4.8 || 9.5 || align=center|
|-
|align="left"| || align="center"|G || align="left"|Western Kentucky || align="center"|2 || align="center"|– || 139 || 3,480 || 368 || 188 || 1,332 || 25.0 || 2.6 || 1.4 || 9.6 || align=center|
|-
|align="left"| || align="center"|G || align="left"|Harvard || align="center"|2 || align="center"|– || 153 || 4,694 || 434 || 791 || 1,985 || 30.7 || 2.8 || 5.2 || 13.0 || align=center|
|-
|align="left"| || align="center"|G || align="left"|LSU || align="center"|1 || align="center"| || 64 || 981 || 94 || 155 || 251 || 15.3 || 1.5 || 2.4 || 3.9 || align=center|
|-
|align="left"| || align="center"|G/F || align="left"|Drake || align="center"|5 || align="center"|– || 297 || 7,951 || 916 || 1,002 || 4,384 || 26.8 || 3.1 || 3.4 || 14.8 || align=center|
|-
|align="left"| || align="center"|G || align="left"|Villanova || align="center"|4 || align="center"|– || 218 || 6,332 || 847 || 1,212 || 2,515 || 29.0 || 3.9 || 5.6 || 11.5 || align=center|
|-
|align="left"| || align="center"|G || align="left"|Maryland || align="center"|5 || align="center"|–– || 325 || 9,680 || 792 || 2,358 || 3,756 || 29.8 || 2.4 || 7.3 || 11.6 || align=center|
|-
|align="left"| || align="center"|G || align="left"|Oklahoma State || align="center"|2 || align="center"|– || 60 || 490 || 41 || 45 || 184 || 8.2 || 0.7 || 0.8 || 3.1 || align=center|
|-
|align="left"| || align="center"|G || align="left"|Nebraska || align="center"|1 || align="center"| || 21 || 479 || 40 || 58 || 125 || 22.8 || 1.9 || 2.8 || 6.0 || align=center|
|}

M

|-
|align="left"| || align="center"|G || align="left"|Iona || align="center"|1 || align="center"| || 6 || 21 || 1 || 6 || 8 || 3.5 || 0.2 || 1.0 || 1.3 || align=center|
|-
|align="left"| || align="center"|G/F || align="left"|Houston || align="center"|3 || align="center"|– || 108 || 2,278 || 246 || 169 || 857 || 21.1 || 2.3 || 1.6 || 7.9 || align=center|
|-
|align="left"| || align="center"|G || align="left"|Fresno State || align="center"|1 || align="center"| || 9 || 35 || 7 || 5 || 11 || 3.9 || 0.8 || 0.6 || 1.2 || align=center|
|-
|align="left" bgcolor="#FFFF99"|^ (#24) || align="center"|F/C || align="left"|Petersburg HS (VA) || align="center"|6 || align="center"|– || 464 || 17,780 || 6,959 || 697 || 11,119 || 38.3 || bgcolor="#CFECEC"|15.0 || 1.5 || 24.0 || align=center|
|-
|align="left"| || align="center"|G || align="left"|Penn || align="center"|3 || align="center"|– || 175 || 4,789 || 312 || 543 || 1,457 || 27.4 || 1.8 || 3.1 || 8.3 || align=center|
|-
|align="left" bgcolor="#FFCC00"|+ || align="center"|G/F || align="left"|Duke || align="center"|2 || align="center"|– || 128 || 4,121 || 605 || 412 || 1,998 || 32.2 || 4.7 || 3.2 || 15.6 || align=center|
|-
|align="left"| || align="center"|G || align="left"|Western Carolina || align="center"|3 || align="center"|– || 144 || 4,726 || 434 || 362 || 3,068 || 32.8 || 3.0 || 2.5 || 21.3 || align=center|
|-
|align="left"| || align="center"|F || align="left"|Maryland || align="center"|1 || align="center"| || 10 || 109 || 27 || 3 || 46 || 10.9 || 2.7 || 0.3 || 4.6 || align=center|
|-
|align="left"| || align="center"|F || align="left"|Charlotte || align="center"|2 || align="center"|– || 117 || 1,684 || 363 || 135 || 602 || 14.4 || 3.1 || 1.2 || 5.1 || align=center|
|-
|align="left"| || align="center"|G || align="left"|Florida || align="center"|6 || align="center"|– || 402 || 13,299 || 1,182 || 1,730 || 6,002 || 33.1 || 2.9 || 4.3 || 14.9 || align=center|
|-
|align="left"| || align="center"|F || align="left"|UCLA || align="center"|1 || align="center"| || 61 || 1,564 || 186 || 55 || 460 || 25.6 || 3.0 || 0.9 || 7.5 || align=center|
|-
|align="left"| || align="center"|C || align="left"|Michigan || align="center"|2 || align="center"|– || 99 || 1,373 || 288 || 57 || 455 || 13.9 || 2.9 || 0.6 || 4.6 || align=center|
|-
|align="left"| || align="center"|G || align="left"|Cal State Northridge || align="center"|2 || align="center"|– || 28 || 318 || 57 || 19 || 113 || 11.4 || 2.0 || 0.7 || 4.0 || align=center|
|-
|align="left"| || align="center"|G/F || align="left"|Louisville || align="center"|5 || align="center"|– || 405 || 13,517 || 2,718 || 1,521 || 5,059 || 33.4 || 6.7 || 3.8 || 12.5 || align=center|
|-
|align="left"| || align="center"|G/F || align="left"|Clemson || align="center"|3 || align="center"|– || 76 || 480 || 77 || 16 || 180 || 6.3 || 1.0 || 0.2 || 2.4 || align=center|
|-
|align="left"| || align="center"|F/C || align="left"|Memphis || align="center"|2 || align="center"|– || 56 || 336 || 71 || 15 || 112 || 6.0 || 1.3 || 0.3 || 2.0 || align=center|
|-
|align="left"| || align="center"|G/F || align="left"|Indiana || align="center"|1 || align="center"| || 65 || 1,876 || 199 || 178 || 788 || 28.9 || 3.1 || 2.7 || 12.1 || align=center|
|-
|align="left" bgcolor="#FFFF99"|^ || align="center"|G/F || align="left"|MZCA (NC) || align="center"|6 || align="center"|– || 303 || 11,133 || 1,667 || 1,699 || 6,888 || 36.7 || 5.5 || 5.6 || 22.7 || align=center|
|-
|align="left"| || align="center"|G/F || align="left"|NYU || align="center"|2 || align="center"|– || 37 || 299 || 50 || 21 || 106 || 8.1 || 1.4 || 0.6 || 2.9 || align=center|
|-
|align="left"| || align="center"|F/C || align="left"|Drake || align="center"|1 || align="center"| || 17 || 147 || 39 || 10 || 47 || 8.6 || 2.3 || 0.6 || 2.8 || align=center|
|-
|align="left"| || align="center"|F || align="left"|Long Beach State || align="center"|1 || align="center"| || 44 || 245 || 60 || 5 || 86 || 5.6 || 1.4 || 0.1 || 2.0 || align=center|
|-
|align="left"| || align="center"|F/C || align="left"|Colorado || align="center"|5 || align="center"|– || 298 || 6,190 || 1,658 || 389 || 2,594 || 20.8 || 5.6 || 1.3 || 8.7 || align=center|
|-
|align="left"| || align="center"|F || align="left"|George Washington || align="center"|1 || align="center"| || 4 || 13 || 4 || 1 || 5 || 3.3 || 1.0 || 0.3 || 1.3 || align=center|
|-
|align="left"| || align="center"|F/C || align="left"|Southern Illinois || align="center"|1 || align="center"| || 81 || 2,042 || 516 || 82 || 830 || 25.2 || 6.4 || 1.0 || 10.2 || align=center|
|-
|align="left"| || align="center"|F || align="left"|Houston || align="center"|1 || align="center"| || 39 || 394 || 99 || 17 || 165 || 10.1 || 2.5 || 0.4 || 4.2 || align=center|
|-
|align="left"| || align="center"|F || align="left"|Michigan State || align="center"|3 || align="center"|– || 65 || 728 || 231 || 23 || 200 || 11.2 || 3.6 || 0.4 || 3.1 || align=center|
|-
|align="left"| || align="center"|C || align="left"|Purdue || align="center"|1 || align="center"| || 60 || 1,015 || 222 || 145 || 382 || 16.9 || 3.7 || 2.4 || 6.4 || align=center|
|-
|align="left"| || align="center"|G || align="left"|Kentucky || align="center"|1 || align="center"| || 63 || 1,478 || 130 || 335 || 482 || 23.5 || 2.1 || 5.3 || 7.7 || align=center|
|-
|align="left"| || align="center"|G || align="left"|Rhode Island || align="center"|6 || align="center"|– || 436 || 16,343 || 1,761 || 1,177 || 7,448 || 37.5 || 4.0 || 2.7 || 17.1 || align=center|
|-
|align="left"| || align="center"|F || align="left"|UNLV || align="center"|1 || align="center"| || 20 || 110 || 21 || 7 || 16 || 5.5 || 1.1 || 0.4 || 0.8 || align=center|
|-
|align="left"| || align="center"|F/C || align="left"|Kansas || align="center"|1 || align="center"| || 12 || 113 || 29 || 2 || 29 || 9.4 || 2.4 || 0.2 || 2.4 || align=center|
|-
|align="left"| || align="center"|F/C || align="left"|UTPA || align="center"|2 || align="center"|– || 95 || 3,025 || 952 || 185 || 1,031 || 31.8 || 10.0 || 1.9 || 10.9 || align=center|
|-
|align="left"| || align="center"|G/F || align="left"|Tulsa || align="center"|2 || align="center"|– || 35 || 427 || 48 || 26 || 190 || 12.2 || 1.4 || 0.7 || 5.4 || align=center|
|-
|align="left"| || align="center"|F || align="left"|Kansas || align="center"|2 || align="center"|– || 71 || 1,280 || 235 || 50 || 505 || 18.0 || 3.3 || 0.7 || 7.1 || align=center|
|-
|align="left"| || align="center"|F || align="left"|Maryland || align="center"|2 || align="center"|– || 117 || 1,742 || 339 || 89 || 437 || 14.9 || 2.9 || 0.8 || 3.7 || align=center|
|-
|align="left"| || align="center"|F/C || align="left"|Lithuania || align="center"|4 || align="center"|– || 214 || 4,074 || 848 || 236 || 1,676 || 19.0 || 4.0 || 1.1 || 7.8 || align=center|
|-
|align="left" bgcolor="#FFFF99"|^ (#23) || align="center"|G || align="left"|Niagara || align="center"|13 || align="center"|– || 1,002 || 30,607 || 2,103 || bgcolor="#CFECEC"|4,402 || 17,949 || 30.5 || 2.1 || 4.4 || 17.9 || align=center|
|-
|align="left"| || align="center"|F || align="left"|UCLA || align="center"|1 || align="center"| || 25 || 203 || 22 || 5 || 88 || 8.1 || 0.9 || 0.2 || 3.5 || align=center|
|-
|align="left" bgcolor="#FFFF99"|^ || align="center"|C || align="left"|Georgetown || align="center"|5 || align="center"|– || 267 || 4,171 || 1,452 || 32 || 855 || 15.6 || 5.4 || 0.1 || 3.2 || align=center|
|}

N to P

|-
|align="left"| || align="center"|F || align="left"|Slovenia || align="center"|3 || align="center"|– || 75 || 797 || 111 || 42 || 216 || 10.6 || 1.5 || 0.6 || 2.9 || align=center|
|-
|align="left"| || align="center"|F/C || align="left"|Brazil || align="center"|3 || align="center"|– || 161 || 2,502 || 581 || 136 || 1,100 || 15.5 || 3.6 || 0.8 || 6.8 || align=center|
|-
|align="left"| || align="center"|C || align="left"|NC State || align="center"|3 || align="center"|– || 52 || 301 || 84 || 4 || 92 || 5.8 || 1.6 || 0.1 || 1.8 || align=center|
|-
|align="left"| || align="center"|G/F || align="left"|Utah || align="center"|8 || align="center"|– || 604 || 17,646 || 1,920 || 2,581 || 8,480 || 29.2 || 3.2 || 4.3 || 14.0 || align=center|
|-
|align="left"| || align="center"|G || align="left"|West Florida || align="center"|7 || align="center"|– || 341 || 6,461 || 739 || 1,058 || 1,926 || 18.9 || 2.2 || 3.1 || 5.6 || align=center|
|-
|align="left"| || align="center"|F || align="left"|Marquette || align="center"|2 || align="center"|– || 70 || 455 || 61 || 12 || 186 || 6.5 || 0.9 || 0.2 || 2.7 || align=center|
|-
|align="left"| || align="center"|F || align="left"|UC Santa Barbara || align="center"|1 || align="center"| || 2 || 38 || 1 || 2 || 9 || 19.0 || 0.5 || 1.0 || 4.5 || align=center|
|-
|align="left"| || align="center"|F/C || align="left"|Virginia Union || align="center"|1 || align="center"| || 7 || 25 || 5 || 2 || 9 || 3.6 || 0.7 || 0.3 || 1.3 || align=center|
|-
|align="left"| || align="center"|C || align="left"|Germany || align="center"|1 || align="center"| || 3 || 12 || 1 || 1 || 3 || 4.0 || 0.3 || 0.3 || 1.0 || align=center|
|-
|align="left" bgcolor="#FFFF99"|^ (#34) || align="center"|C || align="left"|Houston || align="center" bgcolor="#CFECEC"|17 || align="center"|– || bgcolor="#CFECEC"|1,177 || bgcolor="#CFECEC"|42,844 || bgcolor="#CFECEC"|13,382 || 2,992 || bgcolor="#CFECEC"|26,511 || 36.4 || 11.4 || 2.5 || 22.5 || align=center|
|-
|align="left"| || align="center"|C || align="left"|Seattle || align="center"|1 || align="center"| || 22 || 124 || 24 || 3 || 34 || 5.6 || 1.1 || 0.1 || 1.5 || align=center|
|-
|align="left"| || align="center"|F/C || align="left"|Louisville || align="center"|2 || align="center"|– || 6 || 74 || 14 || 4 || 18 || 12.3 || 2.3 || 0.7 || 3.0 || align=center|
|-
|align="left"| || align="center"|F/C || align="left"|South Carolina || align="center"|1 || align="center"| || 46 || 462 || 142 || 18 || 188 || 10.0 || 3.1 || 0.4 || 4.1 || align=center|
|-
|align="left"| || align="center"|F || align="left"|Kentucky || align="center"|3 || align="center"|– || 148 || 1,687 || 369 || 86 || 519 || 11.4 || 2.5 || 0.6 || 3.5 || align=center|
|-
|align="left"| || align="center"|F || align="left"|Greece || align="center"|1 || align="center"| || 43 || 795 || 118 || 85 || 182 || 18.5 || 2.7 || 2.0 || 4.2 || align=center|
|-
|align="left"| || align="center"|F || align="left"|Florida || align="center"|3 || align="center"|– || 213 || 7,345 || 1,113 || 701 || 3,002 || 34.5 || 5.2 || 3.3 || 14.1 || align=center|
|-
|align="left"| || align="center"|F || align="left"|Kentucky || align="center"|3 || align="center"|– || 163 || 3,570 || 707 || 145 || 1,362 || 21.9 || 4.3 || 0.9 || 8.4 || align=center|
|-
|align="left"| || align="center"|G || align="left"|Wake Forest || align="center"|2 || align="center"|– || 116 || 3,704 || 578 || 930 || 1,987 || 31.9 || 5.0 || bgcolor="#CFECEC"|8.0 || 17.1 || align=center|
|-
|align="left"| || align="center"|F/C || align="left"|St. John's || align="center"|4 || align="center"|– || 240 || 4,141 || 1,003 || 273 || 1,334 || 17.3 || 4.2 || 1.1 || 5.6 || align=center|
|-
|align="left"| || align="center"|F || align="left"|Missouri State || align="center"|2 || align="center"|– || 43 || 455 || 152 || 27 || 141 || 10.6 || 3.5 || 0.6 || 3.3 || align=center|
|-
|align="left"| || align="center"|F/C || align="left"|Minnesota || align="center"|4 || align="center"|– || 293 || 6,574 || 1,536 || 347 || 2,232 || 22.4 || 5.2 || 1.2 || 7.6 || align=center|
|-
|align="left"| || align="center"|F/C || align="left"|UCLA || align="center"|1 || align="center"| || 22 || 92 || 31 || 1 || 53 || 4.2 || 1.4 || 0.0 || 2.4 || align=center|
|-
|align="left"| || align="center"|G/F || align="left"|Nebraska || align="center"|1 || align="center"| || 49 || 703 || 73 || 26 || 201 || 14.3 || 1.5 || 0.5 || 4.1 || align=center|
|-
|align="left" bgcolor="#FFFF99"|^ || align="center"|G/F || align="left"|Central Arkansas || align="center"|1 || align="center"| || 50 || 2,011 || 323 || 293 || 726 || bgcolor="#CFECEC"|40.2 || 6.5 || 5.9 || 14.5 || align=center|
|-
|align="left"| || align="center"|G/F || align="left"|Xavier || align="center"|1 || align="center"| || 58 || 1,646 || 281 || 106 || 541 || 28.4 || 4.8 || 1.8 || 9.3 || align=center|
|-
|align="left"| || align="center"|F || align="left"|NC State || align="center"|1 || align="center"| || 1 || 19 || 5 || 0 || 4 || 19.0 || 5.0 || 0.0 || 4.0 || align=center|
|-
|align="left"| || align="center"|G || align="left"|Oklahoma || align="center"|3 || align="center"|– || 137 || 2,528 || 214 || 370 || 824 || 18.5 || 1.6 || 2.7 || 6.0 || align=center|
|-
|align="left"| || align="center"|G || align="left"|Argentina || align="center"|1 || align="center"| || 24 || 402 || 39 || 67 || 73 || 16.8 || 1.6 || 2.8 || 3.0 || align=center|
|}

Q to S

|-
|align="left"| || align="center"|G || align="left"|LSU || align="center"|1 || align="center"| || 3 || 13 || 3 || 1 || 4 || 4.3 || 1.0 || 0.3 || 1.3 || align=center|
|-
|align="left"| || align="center"|G/F || align="left"|Long Beach State || align="center"|5 || align="center"|– || 338 || 8,433 || 1,363 || 896 || 2,813 || 24.9 || 4.0 || 2.7 || 8.3 || align=center|
|-
|align="left"| || align="center"|G || align="left"|Washington || align="center"|1 || align="center"| || 63 || 1,275 || 144 || 170 || 436 || 20.2 || 2.3 || 2.7 || 6.9 || align=center|
|-
|align="left"| || align="center"|G/F || align="left"|St. Mary's (TX) || align="center"|10 || align="center"|–– || 762 || 21,718 || 3,706 || 2,253 || 8,823 || 28.5 || 4.9 || 3.0 || 11.6 || align=center|
|-
|align="left"| || align="center"|G/F || align="left"|USC || align="center"|2 || align="center"|– || 61 || 1,103 || 74 || 111 || 346 || 18.1 || 1.2 || 1.8 || 5.7 || align=center|
|-
|align="left"| || align="center"|F || align="left"|Michigan || align="center"|2 || align="center"|– || 82 || 2,138 || 201 || 96 || 728 || 26.1 || 2.5 || 1.2 || 8.9 || align=center|
|-
|align="left"| || align="center"|C || align="left"|Michigan || align="center"|1 || align="center"| || 47 || 219 || 59 || 9 || 88 || 4.7 || 1.3 || 0.2 || 1.9 || align=center|
|-
|align="left" bgcolor="#FFFF99"|^ || align="center"|G/F || align="left"|Kentucky || align="center"|3 || align="center"|– || 172 || 2,764 || 346 || 359 || 1,312 || 16.1 || 2.0 || 2.1 || 7.6 || align=center|
|-
|align="left"| || align="center"|F || align="left"|USC || align="center"|3 || align="center"|– || 178 || 3,048 || 805 || 234 || 855 || 17.1 || 4.5 || 1.3 || 4.8 || align=center|
|-
|align="left" bgcolor="#CCFFCC"|x || align="center"|G || align="left"|Duke || align="center"|1 || align="center"| || 47 || 1,345 || 91 || 109 || 408 || 28.6 || 1.9 || 2.3 || 8.7 || align=center|
|-
|align="left"| || align="center"|C || align="left"|LSU || align="center"|1 || align="center"| || 6 || 33 || 11 || 0 || 14 || 5.5 || 1.8 || 0.0 || 2.3 || align=center|
|-
|align="left"| || align="center"|G/F || align="left"|Centenary || align="center"|1 || align="center"| || 6 || 55 || 10 || 6 || 25 || 9.2 || 1.7 || 1.0 || 4.2 || align=center|
|-
|align="left"| || align="center"|F || align="left"|Kansas || align="center"|1 || align="center"| || 19 || 247 || 77 || 10 || 86 || 13.0 || 4.1 || 0.5 || 4.5 || align=center|
|-
|align="left"| || align="center"|F/C || align="left"|Tennessee State || align="center"|2 || align="center"|– || 92 || 1,645 || 414 || 51 || 601 || 17.9 || 4.5 || 0.6 || 6.5 || align=center|
|-
|align="left"| || align="center"|C || align="left"|Clemson || align="center"|2 || align="center"|– || 101 || 944 || 231 || 25 || 149 || 9.3 || 2.3 || 0.2 || 1.5 || align=center|
|-
|align="left" bgcolor="#FFFF99"|^ || align="center"|F/C || align="left"|Virginia || align="center"|5 || align="center"|– || 305 || 10,674 || 3,189 || 827 || 5,995 || 35.0 || 10.5 || 2.7 || 19.7 || align=center|
|-
|align="left"| || align="center"|F || align="left"|Argentina || align="center"|5 || align="center"|– || 386 || 11,662 || 2,984 || 723 || 5,597 || 30.2 || 7.7 || 1.9 || 14.5 || align=center|
|-
|align="left"| || align="center"|G/F || align="left"|Jackson State || align="center"|2 || align="center"|– || 146 || 3,106 || 401 || 269 || 1,641 || 21.3 || 2.7 || 1.8 || 11.2 || align=center|
|-
|align="left"| || align="center"|F/C || align="left"|Notre Dame || align="center"|1 || align="center"| || 29 || 332 || 79 || 23 || 101 || 11.4 || 2.7 || 0.8 || 3.5 || align=center|
|-
|align="left"| || align="center"|G || align="left"|Georgia Tech || align="center"|1 || align="center"| || 20 || 382 || 54 || 21 || 91 || 19.1 || 2.7 || 1.1 || 4.6 || align=center|
|-
|align="left"| || align="center"|G || align="left"|Russia || align="center"|1 || align="center"| || 9 || 59 || 4 || 3 || 29 || 6.6 || 0.4 || 0.3 || 3.2 || align=center|
|-
|align="left"| || align="center"|F || align="left"|Ohio State || align="center"|2 || align="center"|– || 63 || 1,896 || 217 || 366 || 470 || 30.1 || 3.4 || 5.8 || 7.5 || align=center|
|-
|align="left"| || align="center"|G/F || align="left"|Tulsa || align="center"|1 || align="center"| || 75 || 1,198 || 328 || 75 || 550 || 16.0 || 4.4 || 1.0 || 7.3 || align=center|
|-
|align="left"| || align="center"|F || align="left"|Western Kentucky || align="center"|2 || align="center"|– || 58 || 1,560 || 330 || 164 || 504 || 26.9 || 5.7 || 2.8 || 8.7 || align=center|
|-
|align="left"| || align="center"|C || align="left"|Fresno State || align="center"|3 || align="center"|– || 89 || 1,279 || 368 || 26 || 473 || 14.4 || 4.1 || 0.3 || 5.3 || align=center|
|-
|align="left"| || align="center"|G || align="left"|Wake Forest || align="center"|1 || align="center"| || 28 || 329 || 42 || 64 || 74 || 11.8 || 1.5 || 2.3 || 2.6 || align=center|
|-
|align="left"| || align="center"|F || align="left"|Oak Hill Academy (VA) || align="center"|2 || align="center"|– || 78 || 1,825 || 395 || 193 || 811 || 23.4 || 5.1 || 2.5 || 10.4 || align=center|
|-
|align="left"| || align="center"|G || align="left"|North Carolina || align="center"|6 || align="center"|– || 468 || 13,712 || 889 || 2,457 || 5,910 || 29.3 || 1.9 || 5.3 || 12.6 || align=center|
|-
|align="left"| || align="center"|F/C || align="left"|Alcorn State || align="center"|3 || align="center"|– || 200 || 4,023 || 1,417 || 190 || 594 || 20.1 || 7.1 || 1.0 || 3.0 || align=center|
|-
|align="left"| || align="center"|G || align="left"|Nevada || align="center"|2 || align="center"|– || 48 || 644 || 95 || 47 || 226 || 13.4 || 2.0 || 1.0 || 4.7 || align=center|
|-
|align="left"| || align="center"|G || align="left"|Greece || align="center"|1 || align="center"| || 31 || 272 || 22 || 28 || 85 || 8.8 || 0.7 || 0.9 || 2.7 || align=center|
|-
|align="left"| || align="center"|F || align="left"|Howard || align="center"|1 || align="center"| || 4 || 37 || 6 || 4 || 14 || 9.3 || 1.5 || 1.0 || 3.5 || align=center|
|-
|align="left"| || align="center"|F || align="left"|Little Rock || align="center"|2 || align="center"|– || 9 || 46 || 9 || 1 || 30 || 5.1 || 1.0 || 0.1 || 3.3 || align=center|
|-
|align="left"| || align="center"|G || align="left"|DePaul || align="center"|1 || align="center"| || 16 || 196 || 27 || 39 || 28 || 12.3 || 1.7 || 2.4 || 1.8 || align=center|
|-
|align="left"| || align="center"|F || align="left"|Ole Miss || align="center"|1 || align="center"| || 9 || 88 || 13 || 9 || 25 || 9.8 || 1.4 || 1.0 || 2.8 || align=center|
|-
|align="left"| || align="center"|G || align="left"|Florida State || align="center"|1 || align="center"| || 61 || 1,922 || 337 || 317 || 626 || 31.5 || 5.5 || 5.2 || 10.3 || align=center|
|-
|align="left"| || align="center"|F || align="left"|LSU || align="center"|1 || align="center"| || 66 || 1,344 || 291 || 25 || 586 || 20.4 || 4.4 || 0.4 || 8.9 || align=center|
|}

T

|-
|align="left"| || align="center"|C || align="left"|Croatia || align="center"|1 || align="center"| || 37 || 182 || 57 || 4 || 75 || 4.9 || 1.5 || 0.1 || 2.0 || align=center|
|-
|align="left"| || align="center"|G || align="left"|Texas || align="center"|1 || align="center"| || 4 || 52 || 3 || 3 || 3 || 13.0 || 0.8 || 0.8 || 0.8 || align=center|
|-
|align="left"| || align="center"|G || align="left"|Texas Tech || align="center"|1 || align="center"| || 44 || 774 || 78 || 110 || 158 || 17.6 || 1.8 || 2.5 || 3.6 || align=center|
|-
|align="left"| || align="center"|G || align="left"|UCF || align="center"|2 || align="center"|– || 39 || 380 || 55 || 18 || 167 || 9.7 || 1.4 || 0.5 || 4.3 || align=center|
|-
|align="left"| || align="center"|F || align="left"|Michigan || align="center"|4 || align="center"|– || 249 || 6,335 || 1,164 || 330 || 2,619 || 25.4 || 4.7 || 1.3 || 10.5 || align=center|
|-
|align="left"| || align="center"|G/F || align="left"|Baylor || align="center"|3 || align="center"|– || 143 || 2,349 || 275 || 215 || 1,106 || 16.4 || 1.9 || 1.5 || 7.7 || align=center|
|-
|align="left"| || align="center"|G || align="left"|LSU || align="center"|1 || align="center"| || 9 || 118 || 14 || 7 || 45 || 13.1 || 1.6 || 0.8 || 5.0 || align=center|
|-
|align="left"| || align="center"|G || align="left"|Arizona || align="center"|2 || align="center"|– || 149 || 2,899 || 200 || 250 || 963 || 19.5 || 1.3 || 1.7 || 6.5 || align=center|
|-
|align="left"| || align="center"|C || align="left"|UConn || align="center"|2 || align="center"|– || 7 || 27 || 7 || 0 || 6 || 3.9 || 1.0 || 0.0 || 0.9 || align=center|
|-
|align="left"| || align="center"|F || align="left"|New Mexico || align="center"|4 || align="center"|– || 238 || 6,687 || 1,507 || 366 || 2,334 || 28.1 || 6.3 || 1.5 || 9.8 || align=center|
|-
|align="left"| || align="center"|G/F || align="left"|Fresno State || align="center"|1 || align="center"| || 23 || 222 || 28 || 13 || 62 || 9.7 || 1.2 || 0.6 || 2.7 || align=center|
|-
|align="left"| || align="center"|G || align="left"|LSU || align="center"|1 || align="center"| || 47 || 885 || 115 || 66 || 472 || 18.8 || 2.4 || 1.4 || 10.0 || align=center|
|-
|align="left" bgcolor="#FFCC00"|+ || align="center"|F/C || align="left"|Providence || align="center"|7 || align="center"|– || 518 || 18,631 || 5,010 || 1,338 || 8,177 || 36.0 || 9.7 || 2.6 || 15.8 || align=center|
|-
|align="left"| || align="center"|G || align="left"|West Virginia Tech || align="center"|1 || align="center"| || 21 || 334 || 24 || 40 || 70 || 15.9 || 1.1 || 1.9 || 3.3 || align=center|
|-
|align="left" bgcolor="#FFCC00"|+ (#45) || align="center"|F || align="left"|Michigan || align="center"|11 || align="center"|– || 768 || 25,714 || 6,198 || 1,573 || 13,383 || 33.5 || 8.1 || 2.0 || 17.4 || align=center|
|-
|align="left"| || align="center"|F || align="left"|Venezuela || align="center"|1 || align="center"| || 65 || 1,075 || 122 || 40 || 389 || 16.5 || 1.9 || 0.6 || 6.0 || align=center|
|-
|align="left"| || align="center"|F || align="left"|UNLV || align="center"|3 || align="center"|– || 177 || 3,247 || 868 || 192 || 1,305 || 18.3 || 4.9 || 1.1 || 7.4 || align=center|
|-
|align="left"| || align="center"|C || align="left"|Georgia || align="center"|1 || align="center"| || 13 || 132 || 40 || 3 || 30 || 10.2 || 3.1 || 0.2 || 2.3 || align=center|
|-
|align="left" bgcolor="#CCFFCC"|x || align="center"|F || align="left"|Texas || align="center"|2 || align="center"|– || 164 || 5,083 || 936 || 173 || 1,103 || 31.0 || 5.7 || 1.1 || 6.7 || align=center|
|-
|align="left"| || align="center"|G || align="left"|Memphis || align="center"|1 || align="center"| || 12 || 99 || 8 || 23 || 35 || 8.3 || 0.7 || 1.9 || 2.9 || align=center|
|-
|align="left"| || align="center"|F || align="left"|Phillips || align="center"|1 || align="center"| || 42 || 345 || 78 || 12 || 117 || 8.2 || 1.9 || 0.3 || 2.8 || align=center|
|}

V to Z

|-
|align="left"| || align="center"|G || align="left"|UCLA || align="center"|1 || align="center"| || 40 || 256 || 21 || 28 || 115 || 6.4 || 0.5 || 0.7 || 2.9 || align=center|
|-
|align="left"| || align="center"|G || align="left"|Florida State || align="center"|1 || align="center"| || 63 || 1,225 || 113 || 71 || 610 || 19.4 || 1.8 || 1.1 || 9.7 || align=center|
|-
|align="left"| || align="center"|C || align="left"|Ohio State || align="center"|1 || align="center"| || 43 || 156 || 28 || 8 || 27 || 3.6 || 0.7 || 0.2 || 0.6 || align=center|
|-
|align="left"| || align="center"|G || align="left"|Providence || align="center"|2 || align="center"|– || 84 || 3,117 || 270 || 446 || 1,468 || 37.1 || 3.2 || 5.3 || 17.5 || align=center|
|-
|align="left"| || align="center"|F || align="left"|Virginia || align="center"|2 || align="center"|– || 140 || 2,863 || 465 || 254 || 1,041 || 20.5 || 3.3 || 1.8 || 7.4 || align=center|
|-
|align="left"| || align="center"|G || align="left"|Florida State || align="center"|1 || align="center"| || 14 || 360 || 39 || 43 || 75 || 25.7 || 2.8 || 3.1 || 5.4 || align=center|
|-
|align="left"| || align="center"|F || align="left"|Oklahoma City || align="center"|1 || align="center"| || 30 || 228 || 77 || 7 || 73 || 7.6 || 2.6 || 0.2 || 2.4 || align=center|
|-
|align="left"| || align="center"|G || align="left"|Xavier (LS) || align="center"|1 || align="center"| || 61 || 1,046 || 103 || 243 || 225 || 17.1 || 1.7 || 4.0 || 3.7 || align=center|
|-
|align="left"| || align="center"|F || align="left"|Southern Miss || align="center"|2 || align="center"|– || 77 || 1,177 || 276 || 34 || 330 || 15.3 || 3.6 || 0.4 || 4.3 || align=center|
|-
|align="left"| || align="center"|G || align="left"|VCU || align="center"|1 || align="center"| || 13 || 118 || 18 || 13 || 26 || 9.1 || 1.4 || 1.0 || 2.0 || align=center|
|-
|align="left"| || align="center"|G/F || align="left"|Ball State || align="center"|2 || align="center"|– || 79 || 1,714 || 380 || 111 || 686 || 21.7 || 4.8 || 1.4 || 8.7 || align=center|
|-
|align="left"| || align="center"|F || align="left"|Detroit Mercy || align="center"|1 || align="center"| || 33 || 214 || 35 || 22 || 99 || 6.5 || 1.1 || 0.7 || 3.0 || align=center|
|-
|align="left"| || align="center"|G || align="left"|Baylor || align="center"|2 || align="center"|– || 125 || 4,212 || 321 || 360 || 1,289 || 33.7 || 2.6 || 2.9 || 10.3 || align=center|
|-
|align="left"| || align="center"|G/F || align="left"|Cincinnati || align="center"|1 || align="center"| || 4 || 11 || 0 || 1 || 7 || 2.8 || 0.0 || 0.3 || 1.8 || align=center|
|-
|align="left"| || align="center"|G || align="left"|Arizona State || align="center"|4 || align="center"|– || 108 || 977 || 109 || 92 || 323 || 9.0 || 1.0 || 0.9 || 3.0 || align=center|
|-
|align="left"| || align="center"|G || align="left"|Florida State || align="center"|4 || align="center"|– || 258 || 5,413 || 813 || 400 || 2,648 || 21.0 || 3.2 || 1.6 || 10.3 || align=center|
|-
|align="left"| || align="center"|G || align="left"|Rice || align="center"|1 || align="center"| || 26 || 145 || 16 || 17 || 50 || 5.6 || 0.6 || 0.7 || 1.9 || align=center|
|-
|align="left"| || align="center"|G || align="left"|Cal Poly Pomona || align="center"|3 || align="center"|– || 238 || 5,271 || 942 || 1,418 || 1,668 || 22.1 || 4.0 || 6.0 || 7.0 || align=center|
|-
|align="left"| || align="center"|G || align="left"|La Salle || align="center"|2 || align="center"|– || 128 || 1,936 || 240 || 278 || 890 || 15.1 || 1.9 || 2.2 || 7.0 || align=center|
|-
|align="left"| || align="center"|F || align="left"|Wyoming || align="center"|1 || align="center"| || 1 || 6 || 1 || 0 || 3 || 6.0 || 1.0 || 0.0 || 3.0 || align=center|
|-
|align="left"| || align="center"|G || align="left"|South Gwinnett HS (GA) || align="center"|1 || align="center"| || 23 || 591 || 70 || 56 || 343 || 25.7 || 3.0 || 2.4 || 14.9 || align=center|
|-
|align="left"| || align="center"|F || align="left"|Louisville || align="center"|2 || align="center"|– || 23 || 265 || 43 || 17 || 93 || 11.5 || 1.9 || 0.7 || 4.0 || align=center|
|-
|align="left"| || align="center"|F || align="left"|Indiana || align="center"|2 || align="center"|– || 10 || 156 || 28 || 7 || 63 || 15.6 || 2.8 || 0.7 || 6.3 || align=center|
|-
|align="left"| || align="center"|G/F || align="left"|Maryland || align="center"|3 || align="center"|– || 196 || 4,559 || 713 || 323 || 1,876 || 23.3 || 3.6 || 1.6 || 9.6 || align=center|
|-
|align="left"| || align="center"|F/C || align="left"|Michigan State || align="center"|3 || align="center"|– || 208 || 5,357 || 1,539 || 163 || 2,462 || 25.8 || 7.4 || 0.8 || 11.8 || align=center|
|-
|align="left"| || align="center"|F/C || align="left"|Dwight Morrow HS (NJ) || align="center"|2 || align="center"|– || 124 || 2,620 || 491 || 139 || 888 || 21.1 || 4.0 || 1.1 || 7.2 || align=center|
|-
|align="left"| || align="center"|F || align="left"|Gonzaga || align="center"|1 || align="center"| || 14 || 44 || 10 || 2 || 13 || 3.1 || 0.7 || 0.1 || 0.9 || align=center|
|-
|align="left"| || align="center"|G/F || align="left"|Averett || align="center"|3 || align="center"|– || 107 || 964 || 116 || 38 || 384 || 9.0 || 1.1 || 0.4 || 3.6 || align=center|
|-
|align="left"| || align="center"|G || align="left"|Penn || align="center"|4 || align="center"|– || 165 || 2,933 || 190 || 576 || 828 || 17.8 || 1.2 || 3.5 || 5.0 || align=center|
|-
|align="left"| || align="center"|F || align="left"|Nevada || align="center"|1 || align="center"| || 82 || 1,421 || 246 || 94 || 432 || 17.3 || 3.0 || 1.1 || 5.3 || align=center|
|-
|align="left"| || align="center"|F/C || align="left"|Arizona || align="center"|1 || align="center"| || 7 || 17 || 1 || 2 || 6 || 2.4 || 0.1 || 0.3 || 0.9 || align=center|
|-
|align="left"| || align="center"|G/F || align="left"|Indiana || align="center"|3 || align="center"|– || 153 || 3,356 || 293 || 282 || 1,493 || 21.9 || 1.9 || 1.8 || 9.8 || align=center|
|-
|align="left"| || align="center"|F/C || align="left"|North Carolina || align="center"|1 || align="center"| || 1 || 15 || 2 || 0 || 4 || 15.0 || 2.0 || 0.0 || 4.0 || align=center|
|-
|align="left" bgcolor="#FFFF99"|Yao Ming^ (#11) || align="center"|C || align="left"|China || align="center"|8 || align="center"|– || 486 || 15,818 || 4,494 || 769 || 9,247 || 32.5 || 9.2 || 1.6 || 19.0 || align=center|
|-
|align="left"|Zhou Qi || align="center"|F/C || align="left"|China || align="center"|2 || align="center"|– || 19 || 125 || 22 || 2 || 24 || 6.6 || 1.2 || 0.1 || 1.3 || align=center|
|}

References
General
 

Specific

National Basketball Association all-time rosters
roster